The 2022 Canadian Championship Final was an association football match played between Vancouver Whitecaps FC and Toronto FC at BC Place on July 26, 2022. The match determined the winner of the 2022 Canadian Championship, Canada's primary men's domestic cup competition.

Vancouver Whitecaps won their second title in a 5–3 penalty shoot-out victory following a 1–1 draw, qualifying them for the 2023 CONCACAF Champions League.

Teams

Background
This was the fifth time Vancouver Whitecaps FC and Toronto FC faced each other in the Canadian Championship final with Toronto FC having won all previous ties. The most recent finals meeting took place in 2018 when Toronto FC won 7–4 on aggregate.

Path to the final

Each tie of the four-round tournament was played as a single-leg fixture. Toronto FC received a bye in the preliminary round for being a finalist of the 2021 tournament.

Match details

References

2022 in Canadian soccer
Toronto FC matches
Vancouver Whitecaps FC matches
Sports competitions in Vancouver
July 2022 sports events in Canada
Association football penalty shoot-outs